Bruce Robert Battishall (born 3 September 1946) was a rugby union player who represented Australia.

Battishall, a flanker, was born in Canterbury, New South Wales and claimed 1 international rugby cap for Australia.

References

Australian rugby union players
Australia international rugby union players
1946 births
Living people
Rugby union flankers
Rugby union players from Sydney